Dzmitry Kowb (born 20 January 1987) is a Belarusian former professional footballer who last played for Baranovichi as a forward.

Career
In 2014, while playing for FK Trakai in the A Lyga, he drew international media attention with his goal celebration, in which he celebrated scoring a late equalizer by running into the spectator stands and applauding for himself.

In 2017 he signed with I-League club Minerva Punjab, but eventually left the club without making an appearance.

References

External links
 
 Profile at Belshina website

1987 births
Living people
Belarusian footballers
Association football forwards
Belarusian expatriate footballers
Expatriate footballers in Lithuania
Expatriate footballers in Estonia
Expatriate footballers in India
Belarusian expatriate sportspeople in Estonia
Meistriliiga players
I-League players
FC Belshina Bobruisk players
FC DSK Gomel players
FC Minsk players
FC Dnepr Mogilev players
FK Riteriai players
FC Vitebsk players
FC Gorodeya players
JK Narva Trans players
RoundGlass Punjab FC players
FC Baranovichi players
Footballers from Minsk
Belarusian expatriate sportspeople in Lithuania
Belarusian expatriate sportspeople in India